The Da Vinci Treasure is a 2006 direct-to-video mystery film produced by American studio The Asylum, and directed by Peter Mervis.

The film is considered to be a mockbuster of the 2006 film The Da Vinci Code, and both films were released within the same month.

Plot

The film centres on Michael Archer (C. Thomas Howell), a forensic anthropologist who inadvertently discovers a set of subtle clues within the works of Leonardo da Vinci, that, when interpreted correctly, will lead the finder to "enlightenment".

Archer, convinced of the authenticity of the clues, sets out to locate the treasure by travelling around the world, following each clue. As time passes, however, Archer soon realizes that he is not alone in the quest for the treasure, and that he must combat other, more determined, treasure-seekers who would sooner see him dead.

The secret has the potential to shake the foundations of modern society.

Cast
C. Thomas Howell as Michael Archer
Lance Henriksen as Dr. John Coven
Nicole Sherwin as Giulia Pedina
Alexis Zibolis as Samantha West

Reception

The eFilmCritic, while stating that The Asylum can make the occasionally good movie, found this movie to rip off both The Da Vinci Code and National Treasure, and found the movie "disappointing and lazy" with failed attempts to be historically accurate. TV Guide found the movie to be "cheap". Radio Times gave the movie one star out of five.

See also
 List of American films of 2006
The Va Dinci Cod – A parody of The Da Vinci Code by comedian Adam Roberts

References

External links
The Da Vinci Treasure at The Asylum

2006 independent films
2006 films
2000s mystery films
2006 direct-to-video films
American direct-to-video films
The Asylum films
Mockbuster films
The Da Vinci Code
American independent films
American mystery films
Treasure hunt films
Films directed by Peter Mervis
2006 drama films
2000s English-language films
2000s American films